Goregaon Road railway station is a halt station on the Konkan Railway. The preceding station on the line is Mangaon railway station, also a halt, and the next station is Veer railway station.

References

Railway stations along Konkan Railway line
Railway stations in Raigad district
Ratnagiri railway division